The Flandreau Masonic Temple in Flandreau, South Dakota is a building dating mostly from 1916. It was listed on the National Register of Historic Places in 1989.  It has also been known as the Old Moody County Courthouse.

It is "a massive two-story rectangular Colonial Revival building. Rising from a poured concrete foundation, the wood frame walls are covered with stucco and encircled by a three foot high brick watertable. The temple is capped by a hipped roof covered with wood shingles. A tall brick chimney rises from the northwest (front) corner. Projecting from the center of the west (front) facade is a huge pediment supported by four Ionic columns."

It was originally built in 1882 to serve as the county courthouse, with late-Victorian vernacular style.  It then had "a gable roof with a large gabled dormer projecting from the center of each axial facade", with gables decorated by bargeboards.  It was bought by the Masonic lodge in 1916 and was damaged by fire in 1919.  Major remodeling was required, and added the Colonial Revival treatments.

References

Masonic buildings completed in 1916
Buildings and structures in Moody County, South Dakota
Masonic buildings in South Dakota
Clubhouses on the National Register of Historic Places in South Dakota
National Register of Historic Places in Moody County, South Dakota